Bowmans Addition is an unincorporated community and census-designated place (CDP) in Allegany County, Maryland, United States. As of the 2020 census it had a population of 584.
It is located north of Cumberland in a valley bounded by Wills Mountain to the northwest and Shriver Ridge to the southeast.

Demographics

References

Census-designated places in Allegany County, Maryland
Populated places in the Cumberland, MD-WV MSA
Census-designated places in Maryland
Cumberland, MD-WV MSA